Gabriella Ibolya Szűcs (born 31 August 1984) is a Romanian-Hungarian professional handball player for HC Dunărea Brăila and the Romanian national team. Born in the Socialist Republic of Romania to Hungarian parents, Szűcs holds both Hungarian and Romanian citizenship. Initially a Hungarian international, she has represented Romania from 2015.

Career
Born in Oradea in 1984, her family moved to Hungary before the Romanian Revolution and settled in Debrecen. Her father was a professional footballer, whilst her mother was a handball player, which could have a great influence on that Gabriella started to practice various sports since a very young age. First she tried rhythmic gymnastics later switched to folk dance. In the school she was talented in many sports including basketball and football, but finally she has chosen handball.

She started to play handball at the age of eleven, and whilst in school she already had seven trainings a week. At the age of fourteen she was signed by DVSC, where she spent the next ten seasons. During this time she developed to a quality left back both on domestic and international level. With the Hungarian national team she won bronze medal on the European Championship in 2004, and a year later on the World Championship as well. She was also member of the team which finished fourth on the Olympic Games in Beijing. In 2009, she moved to Romanian top club CS Oltchim Râmnicu Vâlcea, where she spent two season before re-joined her old club DVSC.

Her second spell at the club, however, was cut short after DVSC faced heavy financial problems and let many of their key players to go to axe their wage budget. Szűcs remained by the club until December 2011, when she moved to the Romanian Championship again, this time to HC Zalău, where she joined her former coach Gheorghe Tadici.

Personal life
She has a younger sister, Nikolett, who is also a professional handball player.

Achievements
World Championship:
Bronze Medalist: 2005
European Championship:
Bronze Medalist: 2004
Youth European Championship:
Bronze Medalist: 2001
Junior World Championship:
Silver Medalist: 2003
Junior European Championship:
Silver Medalist: 2002
Hungarian Cup:
Bronze Medalist: 2001, 2008
Romanian Championship:
Winner: 2009, 2010, 2014
Silver Medalist: 2013, 2015
Romanian Cup:
Winner: 2013, 2014, 2015
Romanian Supercup:
Winner: 2013, 2014, 2015
EHF Champions League:
Finalist: 2010
Semifinalist: 2009
EHF Cup:
Finalist: 2012
Semifinalist: 2006, 2013

References

External links
Career statistics at Worldhandball

1984 births
Living people
Sportspeople from Oradea
Romanian female handball players
Hungarian female handball players
Handball players at the 2008 Summer Olympics
Handball players at the 2016 Summer Olympics
Olympic handball players of Hungary
Olympic handball players of Romania
CS Minaur Baia Mare (women's handball) players
Expatriate handball players
Romanian expatriate sportspeople in Hungary
SCM Râmnicu Vâlcea (handball) players
Romanian sportspeople of Hungarian descent